Brad Leggett (born January 16, 1966)  is a former American football center in the National Football League. He played professionally for the New Orleans Saints and the Detroit Lions.

Early days
Leggett was born in Vicksburg, Mississippi. He played prep football at Fountain Valley High School in Fountain Valley, California. He is in the high schools hall of fame after only playing football his senior year there.

College Career
Leggett recruited by several colleges and chose to play college football college football at the University of Southern California.

During his time at University of Southern California, Leggett was part of 3 PAC 10 championship teams playing in 3 consecutive Rose Bowls. Leggett made 1st team All PAC 10 and was chosen to play in the Senior Bowl.  Leggett was honorable mention All American his senior year at USC.

Leggett was recently voted the second best center to ever to play at USC https://wearesc.com/o-nso-the-usc-mount-rushmore-series-the-centers/

https://www.youtube.com/watch?v=jqYsenr2Vts

Leggett's Father
Leggett's father Earl Leggett was a first round pick for the Chicago Bears in 1957 and played 12 years in the NFL. He finished his career with the New Orleans Saints. Earl then coached 25 years in the NFL with the majority of his time coaching the defensive line with the Oakland/Los Angeles Raider.

NFL career
Leggett was originally an 8th round selection (219th overall pick) by the Denver Broncos in the 1990 NFL Draft.  He played for the New Orleans Saints (1990–1991, 1993) and the Detroit Lions (1992). 

Leggett and his father Earl were the first father and son to both play in the Saints franchise history. Leggett’s NFL career was derailed by back injuries forcing him to retire early.

After NFL career
Leggett being a successful entrepreneur has produced two infomercials, built web based affiliate marketing programs, owned and operated a nutrition education business with seven locations, and was the owner of a sports nutrition company. 

Leggett in 2016 launched Pro Players Business Network, the only business networking site for former former players and has a membership of over 15,000 retired players 
( https://proplayersbusinessnetwork.com/ ) he reaches through a monthly newsletter.

References

 https://wearesc.com/o-nso-the-usc-mount-rushmore-series-the-centers/
 https://proplayersbusinessnetwork.com/
 https://proplayerscbdnetwork.com/

External links
Stats
Pro-Football-Reference.Com

1966 births
Living people
Sportspeople from Vicksburg, Mississippi
People from Fountain Valley, California
Players of American football from California
Sportspeople from Orange County, California
American football centers
USC Trojans football players
New Orleans Saints players
Detroit Lions players